Inachos is a former municipality in Aetolia-Acarnania, West Greece, Greece. Since the 2011 local government reform it is part of the municipality Amfilochia, of which it is a municipal unit. It is located in the northernmost part of Aetolia-Acarnania. Its land area is 585.382 km². Its population was 4,760 at the 2011 census. Its municipal seat was the town of Neo Chalkiopoulo (pop. 569). Its largest other villages are Empesos (pop. 444), Amorgianoi (363), Thyamos (386), Perdikaki (356), and Nea Malesiada (308).

Subdivisions
The municipal unit Inachos is subdivided into the following communities (constituent villages in brackets):
Chalkiopoulo (Neo Chalkiopoulo, Agioi Theodoroi, Agios Vlasios, Agios Minas, Agrapidokampos, Xomeri, Prosilia, Chalkiopouloi)
Agridi (Neo Agridi, Dromitsa, Kaminos)
Alevrada (Alevrada, Kremasta Sykias, Pistiana)
Amorgianoi (Amorgianoi, Malateika, Prantiko, Chamoriki)
Vrouviana (Vrouviana, Avlaki)
Giannopouloi (Paliampela, Giannopouloi)
Empesos (Empesos, Grammatsouli, Skatzokampos, Sykea, Ftelia)
Malesiada (Nea Malesiada, Ano Kampos, Maraneli)
Bampali
Patiopoulo (Patiopoulo, Thyamos, Petsalia, Fragkou)
Perdikaki (Perdikaki, Pigadia)
Petrona (Petrona, Varko Kyprio, Ypapanti)
Podogora
Stathas (Stathas, Pavliada, Potamia)
Triklino (Triklino, Ampeli)

References

External links
Municipality of Inachos 

Populated places in Aetolia-Acarnania